This is a list of airports in Grenada.

Grenada is an island country and sovereign state in the southeastern Caribbean Sea. It consists of the island of Grenada and smaller islands at the southern end of the Grenadines, including Carriacou, Petit Martinique, Ronde Island, Caille Island, Diamond Island, Large Island, Saline Island, and Frigate Island. The main island of Grenada is divided into six parishes. The capital is St. George's. Grenada is located northwest of Trinidad and Tobago, northeast of Venezuela, and southwest of Saint Vincent and the Grenadines.



Airports 

Airport names shown in bold indicate the airport has scheduled service on commercial airlines.

See also 

 SVG Air
 Transport in Grenada
 List of airports by ICAO code: T#TG - Grenada
 Wikipedia: WikiProject Aviation/Airline destination lists: North America#Grenada

References 
 
  - includes IATA codes
 Great Circle Mapper: Airports in Grenada - IATA and ICAO codes

Grenada
Airports
Airports
Grenada
Airports